Daniel Phillip Henney (born November 28, 1979) is an American actor and model. He first came into international prominence with his television debut as Dr. Henry Kim on the Korean drama My Lovely Sam Soon (2005).

He has gone on to star in films such as Seducing Mr. Perfect (2006), My Father (2007), X-Men Origins: Wolverine (2009), Shanghai Calling (2012), The Last Stand (2013), One Night Surprise (2013), and Big Hero 6 (2014). In television, he has starred in the Korean Spring Waltz and as well as US television series Hawaii Five-0 and Criminal Minds: Beyond Borders. He joined the regular cast of Criminal Minds for its 13th, 14th and 15th seasons. He currently stars as Lan Mandragoran in the 2021 adaptation of The Wheel of Time.

Early life 
Henney was born on November 28, 1979 in Carson City, Michigan. His mother Christine Henney, an American adoptee from Busan, South Korea, was a nurse. His father Philip Henney, an American of British and Irish descent, worked in a factory. He was a star basketball player at Carson City-Crystal High School and led the Eagles to the MHSAA Central region (CSAA) 2nd-place finish during his senior year in 1998.

Henney attended various colleges—including Albion College, Alma College and Elgin Community College—but never completed his college studies due to his burgeoning modeling career. He was credited on many online portals for a time to have had graduated with an economics degree from the University of Illinois at Chicago. However that was proven to be false when an academic scandal in 2007 revealed that several South Korean social figures and celebrities, such as Choi Soo-jong and Jang Mi-hee, had falsified their academic records.

Career 
Henney moved to South Korea after having lived on and off in Hong Kong and Taiwan for four years. While in New York in 2004, he did some work Off-Broadway while auditioning for television shows.

Henney started modeling in the U.S. in 2001 and worked in France, Hong Kong, and many more while attending college. After his debut in South Korea with an advertisement for the Amore Pacific's cosmetic "Odyssey Sunrise", he became a spokesperson for commercials with Jun Ji-hyun for Olympus cameras and Kim Tae-hee for Daewoo Electronics's Klasse air conditioners. Henney is signed with DNA Models in New York under the celebrity division.While modeling in South Korea for Olympus in 2005, he was scouted by a talent manager who got Henney a role in the Korean drama My Lovely Sam Soon, aka My Name is Kim Sam Soon. Henney, who did not speak any Korean, was cast as an Asian American physician Henry Kim who struggled with the language. He played a supporting role in a love triangle between female lead Hee-jin (Jung Ryeo-won) and restaurateur Hyun Jin-heon (Hyun Bin). The show was widely popular, with over half of South Korean households estimated to have watched the finale.

Henney then starred in another romantic drama Spring Waltz as Philip, a foreign music manager, in 2006. He resumed his modeling career when he was featured in a Bean Pole campaign with Gwyneth Paltrow.

Henney made his feature film debut in another romantic comedy Seducing Mr. Perfect (2006), which coincided with pop star Rain's debut in I'm a Cyborg, But That's OK (2006). His second film, My Father, won multiple awards in South Korea and Henney became the first foreigner to sweep all the major cinema awards in the Best New Actor category.

He later learned the language and appeared on a few variety shows, such as Family Outing.

His first American role was as Agent Zero in the film X-Men Origins: Wolverine (2009).

In the fall season of 2009, he played "Dr. David Lee" in the CBS television drama Three Rivers.

In 2010, Henney returned to South Korea television for KBS2's The Fugitive: Plan B, alongside Rain and actress Lee Na-young.

Since 2012, Henney has appeared in several American TV series. 

Henney starred as Special Agent Matt Simmons in the American television series Criminal Minds: Beyond Borders, a spin-off of Criminal Minds, for two seasons from 2016 to 2017. After the Beyond Borders's cancellation, it was announced in June 2017 that Henney's Matt Simmons would continue on Criminal Minds as a series regular for season 13. He remained a part of the cast until the series concluded in season 15.

In September 2019, Henney was cast in the supporting role of Lan Mandragoran in Amazon Video's adaptation of Robert Jordan's fantasy epic The Wheel of Time.

Filmography

Film

Television

Awards and nominations

See also 

 Hines Ward — NFL player of African and Korean descent who brought interest in the sport to South Korea
Sean Richard Dulake — American actor of Korean and British descent who acted in Korean dramas

References

External links 

 Daniel Henney on DNA Model Management's website 
 

21st-century American male actors
Living people
Albion College alumni
American male actors of Korean descent
American models of Korean descent
American male film actors
American male television actors
American male voice actors
American people of Irish descent
American people of South Korean descent
Male actors from Michigan
Male models from Michigan
South Korean people of American descent
South Korean people of Irish descent
People from Carson City, Michigan
1979 births
Alma College alumni